An Election to the Edinburgh Corporation was held on 7 May 1963, alongside municipal elections across Scotland. Of the councils 69 seats, 23 were up for election.

After the election Edinburgh Corporation remained under No Overall Control, composed of 33 Progressives, 31 Labour councillors, and 5 Liberal.

Aggregate results

Ward Results

References

1963
1963 Scottish local elections